Safeword is a British television comedy panel game show that aired on ITV2 from 23 July 2015 to 7 July 2016 and is hosted by Rick Edwards.

Gameplay
The show begins with the teams conjuring up a safeword; to aid them, they are shown two particularly humiliating photos from their life with a succinct caption selected from the "safe word generator". A safeword is then picked by the team.

The first round, Hacked, involves the social media accounts of the guests being handed over to the opposing teams. The more posts they can stomach being posted, the more points they receive.

The second round, Burned, involves the team captains mocking the other team's guest using an image and caption from the roulette until either the time ends or they uses their safeword. The team captains take it in turns; one captain will attack, and once the time ends, the other captain will get up and attack. The guest receives one point for surviving each captain's diatribe, with two points available to each guest.

The third round, Slam Down, involves the guests insulting each other, with each guest obtaining one point per insult delivered. If they are unable think of an insult, they may use their safeword, by doing so they delegate to their team captains who may then issue an insult on their behalf. For each caustic remark successfully delivered, a point is awarded. The guest with the most points at the end of this round wins the game; the guest that loses is subjected to "a swift and nasty exit": Edwards pulls a chain which flings the guest's seat backwards causing the guest to disappear into the scenery.

Transmissions

Episodes
The coloured backgrounds denote the result of each of the shows:

 indicates David's team won
 indicates Katherine's team won
 indicates the game ended in a draw

Series 1 (2015)

Series 2 (2016)

Scores

Controversy
Between the broadcast of the first and second episodes contestant Sinitta berated the show, saying that she "hated Everything about your show. Language and topics were vile! Meant to only roast Me #cleverEditNeeded wish I'd walked out." In response whilst on Lorraine, Edwards said that he had "no sympathy for her" and that "she could have used her safe word".

International adaptations

References

External links
 
 
 

2010s British game shows
2015 British television series debuts
2016 British television series endings
English-language television shows
ITV comedy
ITV panel games
Television series by STV Studios